Zarzar Lake is a lake located  northwest of Damascus, Syria. It is lies to the east of Haloua. In the northeastern part of the lake is a dam.

External links
Photograph

Lakes of Syria